The 2019–20 Landstede Hammers season was the 25th season in the existence of the club. The club played in the Dutch Basketball League (DBL), NBB Cup and FIBA Europe Cup

The season marked Landstede's first European appearance in 19 years.  On 19 August 2019, the club announced they renamed to Landstede Hammers.

Players

Squad information

Depth chart

Transactions

In

|}

Out

|}

Pre-season
The Hammers began their pre-season on 31 August 2019.

Dutch Basketball Supercup

As the champions of the 2018–19 Dutch Basketball League, Hammers qualified for its second Supercup game.

Dutch Basketball League

Regular season

FIBA Europe Cup

Regular season

Top 16

References

External links
 Club website

Landstede Hammers
Landstede Hammers
Landstede Hammers